Fath ol Jalil (also Romanized as Fatḥ ol Jalīl; also known as Fatḥoljalīl) is a village in Sarkhun Rural District, Qaleh Qazi District, Bandar Abbas County, Hormozgan Province, Iran. At the 2006 census, its population was 216, in 48 families.

References 

Populated places in Bandar Abbas County